Harishankar Khatik is an Indian politician and a member of the Legislative Assembly of India representing the Jatara constituency of Madhya Pradesh and is a member of the Bhartiya Janata Party.

Early life and education 
Harishankar Khatik was born in Tikamgarh district and completed 12th, higher secondary in 1985 and diploma in Civil Engineering in 1994 from Polytechnic, Bhopal.

Political career 
Harishankar Khatik is a MLA representing the Jatara constituency and is a member of the Bhartiya Janata Party.

References

External links 
 Harishankar Khatik on Facebook
 https://twitter.com/harishnkarbjp?lang=en

1969 births
Living people
Bharatiya Janata Party politicians from Madhya Pradesh